Konino is a rural locality (a village) in Vorshinskoye Rural Settlement, Sobinsky District, Vladimir Oblast, Russia. The population was 146 as of 2010. There are 4 streets.

Geography 
Konino is located on the right bank of the Vorsha River, 12 km northeast of Sobinka (the district's administrative centre) by road. Kuzmino is the nearest rural locality.

References 

Rural localities in Sobinsky District